Barbara Farnsworth Heslop  (née Cupit, 26 January 1925 – 20 December 2013) was a New Zealand immunologist specialising in transplantation immunology and immunogenetics.

Biography
Born in Auckland, Heslop was educated at Epsom Girls' Grammar School from 1938 to 1941 and then attended the University of Otago, graduating MB ChB in 1949 and MD in 1954.

She married surgeon John Herbert Heslop, noted for his work on skin carcinogenesis. They had two daughters: Helen, a transplant scientist; and Hilary, a food specialist.

Heslop gained recognition in the medical community for both her research and her teaching, at a time when women scientists were scarce.  She was made a Fellow of the Royal Australasian College of Surgeons (RACS) for services to surgical sciences in 1975. In 1990, in honour of her research achievements she was appointed a Fellow of the Royal Society of New Zealand mainly based on her publications on allogeneic lymphocyte cytotoxicity (a natural killer cell mediated phenomenon). The same year, she and her husband John Heslop were joint recipients of the Sir Louis Barnett Medal awarded by the RACS.

In the 1991 New Year Honours, Heslop was appointed a Commander of the Order of the British Empire, for services to medical education.

Heslop died in Dunedin in 2013.

In 2017, Heslop was selected as one of the Royal Society Te Apārangi's "150 women in 150 words", celebrating the contributions of women to knowledge in New Zealand.

Heslop Medal
To commemorate Heslop's work and that of her husband, John Heslop, the Heslop Medal was established by the Royal Australasian College of Surgeons in 2004 to recognise and reward outstanding contributions to the Board of Basic Surgical Education and Training and its committees.

Selected publications

  (A personal reflection on the anniversary of the Cartwright Inquiry.)

References

External links
Full list of publications on Google Scholar

1925 births
2013 deaths
People from Auckland
University of Otago alumni
New Zealand women scientists
Women biologists
New Zealand medical researchers
Academic staff of the University of Otago
New Zealand Commanders of the Order of the British Empire
Fellows of the Royal Society of New Zealand
New Zealand immunologists
People educated at Epsom Girls' Grammar School
20th-century women scientists
New Zealand scientists